Parkin's Patch is a Yorkshire Television production that aired on ITV from 1969 to 1970.  John Flanagan played PC Moss Parkin, a police constable in the North York Moors.  The series was filmed in the North York Moors as well as certain scenes being shot in Leeds, including parts around the Farm Hill estate in Meanwood.

References

External links

1969 British television series debuts
1970 British television series endings
1960s British drama television series
1970s British drama television series
Television series by Yorkshire Television
ITV television dramas
Television series by ITV Studios
1960s British crime television series
1970s British crime television series
Television shows set in Yorkshire
English-language television shows